Megacraspedus squalida is a moth of the family Gelechiidae. It was described by Edward Meyrick in 1926. It is found in Spain.

The forewings are whitish, irregularly sprinkled with fuscous and blackish, the veins forming obscurely defined white lines. The hindwings are whitish.

References

Moths described in 1926
Megacraspedus